Allende en su laberinto is a 2014 Chilean film directed by Miguel Littín. The film is a fictional account of the events in the Palacio de la Moneda in Santiago de Chile and the last hours of life of President Salvador Allende during the 1973 Chilean coup d'état.

The film has been screened in Chile and in Venezuela. The film also won the historical miniseries category of the Television National Fund in Chile, gaining approval to be aired as a television series.

References

External links 
 
 Allende en su laberinto in Film Affinity

Chilean drama films
2014 films
2010s Spanish-language films
Films directed by Miguel Littín
Films about the Chilean military dictatorship
Films set in 1973